Amedeo Matacena (15 September 1963 – 16 September 2022) was an Italian politician who served as a Deputy.

References

1963 births
2022 deaths
Forza Italia politicians
20th-century Italian politicians
21st-century Italian politicians
Deputies of Legislature XII of Italy
Deputies of Legislature XIII of Italy
Politicians from Catania